Caelostomus klugii is a species of ground beetle in the subfamily Pterostichinae. It was described by Fairmaire in 1868.

References

Caelostomus
Beetles described in 1868